Sharon Sanders Brooks is a former American Democrat politician from Kansas City, Missouri, who served in the Missouri House of Representatives.

Born in Lynchburg, Virginia, she attended Francis L. Cardozo High School, Bennett College, and American University. She has worked as a historical consultant, a civil rights investigator, and a fair housing investigator.

References

20th-century American politicians
21st-century American politicians
20th-century American women politicians
21st-century American women politicians
African-American state legislators in Missouri
African-American women in politics
Democratic Party members of the Missouri House of Representatives
Living people
Women state legislators in Missouri
Year of birth missing (living people)